Gábor Makrai (born 26 June 1996) is a Hungarian professional footballer who plays for Siófok, on loan from Pécsi MFC.

Club statistics

Updated to games played as of 15 May 2021.

References
MLSZ 

1996 births
Living people
Sportspeople from Eger
Hungarian footballers
Hungary youth international footballers
Hungary under-21 international footballers
Association football forwards
Puskás Akadémia FC players
Csákvári TK players
Diósgyőri VTK players
Pécsi MFC players
BFC Siófok players
Nemzeti Bajnokság I players
Nemzeti Bajnokság II players